Jan Galabov (born 12 June 1996) is a Czech professional volleyball player. He is a member of the Czech Republic national team. At the professional club level, he plays for Chaumont VB 52.

Honours

Clubs
 National championships
 2014/2015  Czech Championship, with Dukla Liberec
 2015/2016  Czech Cup, with Dukla Liberec
 2015/2016  Czech Championship, with Dukla Liberec
 2017/2018  Czech Cup, with Dukla Liberec

Individual awards
 2022: European League – Most Valuable Player

References

External links
 
 Player profile at Volleybox.net 

1996 births
Living people
Czech men's volleyball players
Czech expatriate sportspeople in France
Expatriate volleyball players in France
Czech expatriate sportspeople in Poland
Expatriate volleyball players in Poland
BKS Visła Bydgoszcz players
Outside hitters